The tekpi is a short-handled trident from Southeast Asia. Known as tekpi in Malay, it is called chabang or cabang (Dutch spelling: tjabang meaning "branch") in Indonesian, siang tépi (雙短鞭 ) in Hokkien, and trisul (ตรีศูล ) in Thai. More than a weapon, it was also important as a Hindu-Buddhist symbol. It is comparable to the Okinawan Sai.

Description

The tekpi is made of iron or steel, the basic form of the weapon is that of a sharp and pointed, dagger-shaped metal truncheon, with two curved prongs projecting from the handle. The prongs extend from the hilt and are useful for grabbing away an opponent's weapon. The length of the tekpi ranges from 12 to 25 inches.

History
The tekpi is believed to have been derived from the ancient Indian trishula, a trident which can be either long or short-handled. The tekpi itself is occasionally referred to as a trisula, especially in Indonesia. The earliest evidence of the tekpi comes from Srivijaya in Indonesia where it was originally used defensively like a shield. Tekpi are also found in the Malacca Sultanate in Malaysia; this tekpi was used by the nobles of the palace. Other sources propose that it was brought to Southeast Asia from China, but the tekpi in Sumatra and Malay Peninsula predates its earliest known use in China and it seems unlikely for the Chinese to introduce an Indian weapon to a region already heavily influenced by the culture of India. Use of the tekpi probably spread with the influence of Indian religion and eventually reached Malaysia, Okinawa, China, Thailand, and other parts of Indochina.

Technique
Tekpi are generally wielded in pairs, favouring short, fast stabbing movements similar to a knife or a kris. Defensively, the tekpi is effective for guarding against bladed weapons. The outer prongs are meant for catching the opponent's weapon, allowing for a disarm or deflection of the attack. When rotated so that the tip is pointing towards the user's elbow, the hilt could be used in a thrusting blow while the shaft is kept parallel to and against the forearm to block attacks. When not in use, the tekpi are hung at the waist.

See also 

Sai (weapon)
Trishula
Weapons of silat

References

Weapons of Indonesia
Weapons of Malaysia
Tridents

ms:Tekpi